Olena Volodymyrivna Zelenska (born 6 February 1978) is a Ukrainian architect and screenwriter who is the current First Lady of Ukraine as the wife of President Volodymyr Zelenskyy.

Early life and career 
Olena Kiyashko was born on 6 February 1978 in Kryvyi Rih. She studied at Kryvyi Rih Gymnasium № 95, where she met her future husband, Volodymyr Zelenskyy. In 2000, she graduated from Kryvyi Rih Technical University, majoring in “Urban and Construction Management”, receiving a specialist diploma. She also graduated from a music school with a piano class.

 
In 2003, she and Zelenskyy got married. Olena and Volodymyr Zelenskyy are the parents of two children: daughter Oleksandra/Aleksandra (born on 15 July 2004) and son Kyrylo/Kirill (born on 21 January 2013). The family has several pets; two dogs, a cat, a parrot and a guinea pig. Zelenska enjoys sports, likes to read and is a fan of cinematography. The family lives in Kyiv.

Professional activity 
Olena Zelenska has been a member of the Kvartal 95 studio team since its foundation. The studio is engaged in the production of show projects, entertainment programs, movies, series and is the most famous and the most rated in Ukraine. Zelenska is a member of the author group and participates in writing texts for all projects of the Kvartal 95 studio, worked on the concept of Make the Comedian Laugh program and was one of the screenwriters of Like the Cossacks… comedy. She is also one of the producers of Women's Kvartal project.

First Lady of Ukraine

Social initiatives before the full-scale invasion 

The social activities of the First Lady of Ukraine before the war had three main directions: the health of future generations, equal opportunities and cultural diplomacy.

Olena Zelenska initiated such projects as the improvement of the school food system and the development of the National Strategy for a safe school environment, the fight against domestic and gender based violence, the barrier-free environment, and the introduction of audio guides in Ukrainian in museums around the world.

On December 3, 2020, the President signed the Decree “On ensuring the creation of a barrier-free space in Ukraine”. At the initiative of the First Lady, the National Barrier-Free Strategy — standards of equal opportunities for all population groups — was adopted, as well as the Action Plan for overcoming barriers — a road map for each department — was developed.

On January 13, 2020, she became a member of the Development Council of the Mystetskyi Arsenal National Art and Culture Museum Complex.

On September 11, 2020, at the initiative of the President's wife, Ukraine joined the Biarritz Partnership, undertaking commitments in the areas of gender equality and the development of barrier-free public space.

In 2021, a large-scale reform of school meals took place. A new full-fledged 4-week menu was presented, the modernization of food storage facilities began, and the behavioral communication campaign of UNICEF in Ukraine on healthy nutrition for children and parents was launched.

As part of the initiative of the First Lady of Ukraine, more than 50 audio guides in the Ukrainian language have already been launched in the best cultural institutions in more than 30 countries. The project started in 2020.

On August 23, 2021, the First Kyiv Summit of First Ladies and Gentlemen took place in Kyiv at the initiative of Olena Zelenska. Eleven first ladies from different countries joined the event. The main topic of discussion was the post-COVID reality. At the end of the event, the participants approved a joint declaration.

The purpose of the summits is to unite the first ladies and gentlemen for the purpose of creating an international platform to share experience and implement joint projects for the well-being of people in the world; to discuss the current problems and activities of the first ladies and gentlemen to solve them; to make the voice of every first lady and gentleman more influential.

Activities since the Russian invasion 

After the 2022 Russian invasion of Ukraine, Zelenska was described as Russia's target number two. In mid-March, she was in Ukraine at an undisclosed location. She released a statement highlighting the names of children killed during the invasion. During the war, her efforts have focused on humanitarian aid, especially the evacuation of children with disabilities through Poland and the importing of incubators to hospitals in warzone areas. Zelenska made her first public appearance since the start of the invasion in a 8 May 2022 meeting with Jill Biden in Uzhhorod. Biden's trip to Ukraine, which coincided with Mother's Day as celebrated in the US and in Ukraine, was not publicly disclosed in advance.

At the initiative of the First Lady, projects in the field of medicine are being developed: evacuation of children with severe cancer diseases abroad with further treatment there, the search for equipment for children's hospitals, in particular, incubators for newborns.

In the humanitarian sphere, Olena Zelenska takes care of sending orphans for a long-term stay abroad. The First Lady also oversees humanitarian aid to family-type orphanages, large families, and elderly people who have remained and live in the liberated territories to reinforce the connection with the Homeland for forcibly displaced people, the First Lady initiated the project “Books without borders”. 260,000 books in Ukrainian were printed for children who left their homes due to Russian aggression and found shelter in 20 countries.

The project “Ukrainian bookshelf” is being carried out under the patronage of the First Lady. It provides for the distribution of Ukrainian literature and its translations in the world's leading libraries. More than 20 countries have already joined the initiative.

In the “Barrier-Free Handbook” launched by the First Lady, a new section has been created with wartime tips and instructions for families with disabilities, the elderly and their loved ones, people with disabilities.

In May 2022, Olena Zelenska initiated the creation of the National Program of Mental Health and Psychosocial Support. The program is designed to help Ukrainians overcome the consequences of the traumatic events of the war.

On 19 July 2022, Zelenska started her visit to the United States. On the first day of the visit, Zelenska met with the US Secretary of State Antony Blinken, and Samantha Power, the Administrator of the United States Agency for International Development. On the second day of the visit, she held a meeting with the first lady of the United States, Jill Biden, at the White House. Zelenska was also met on the porch of the White House by US President Joe Biden and Vice President Kamala Harris.

Zelenska also addressed the US Congress on the second day of her visit, becoming the first First Lady of another country to speak before the US Congress. She called for more military aid to the Ukrainian Armed Forces to protect the country from Russian invasion.

Zelenska dedicated the beginning of her speech to the families and children impacted by the Russian invasion of Ukraine. One of the images included was of a four-year-old Liza Dmytriyeva, who was killed in an air strike in the central-western city of Vinnytsia. Zelenska also showed photos and videos of the victims of the Kremenchuk shopping mall attack and other numerous victims of Russian invasion.

During the trip, Zelenska also accepted the Dissident Human Rights Award at the Victims of Communism Memorial in Washington, D.C. on behalf of the entire Ukrainian people.

On July 23, Ukraine will host the second Summit of First Ladies and Gentlemen dedicated to the post-war reconstruction of our country. The event is planned to be held in the format of a telebridge between different countries of the world. Within the Summit, fundraising for C-type ambulance vehicles was announced. USD 6.4 million was raised in total, allowing to purchase 84 ambulance vehicles for the Ministry of Health of Ukraine. These ambulance vehicles are equipped with everything necessary to quickly and safely transport the seriously injured to the hospitals.

In September 2022, Zelenska was present as an invitee to Ursula von der Leyen's third State of the European Union address, where the EU Commission President rendered homage to her courage during the war in Ukraine.

On 19 September 2022, Zelenska attended the state funeral in London of Queen Elizabeth II to pay her respects to the late monarch "on behalf of all Ukrainians".

On 2 October 2022, Zelenska visited Turkey, where she discussed the evacuation of Ukrainian orphans to Turkey with Turkish first lady Emine Erdoğan, met ecumenical patriarch Bartholomew I of Constantinople, and launched the Ukrainian corvette Hetman Ivan Mazepa.

Zelenska was alleged by social media and several news outlets in France to have spent over €40,000 during a shopping spree in Paris, during her visit in December, however these claims proved to be false, and originally circulated by pro-Russia media.

Olena Zelenska Foundation 

On 22 September 2022, Olena Zelenska presented her foundation at a charity evening in New York City during the 77th UN General Assembly.

The Foundation's primary goal is to restore Ukraine's human capital so that every Ukrainian feels physically and mentally healthy, protected, and able to exercise their right to education, work, and build a future in Ukraine.

The Foundation has three key directions: medicine, education and humanitarian aid. Within these areas, it will provide targeted assistance, invest in reconstructing preschool and school education institutions, polyclinics and outpatient clinics, and provide grants for training and scientific developments. The Foundation sees foreign business and other international foundations as its key partners and donors.

Awards 

Zelenska received ShEO Awards 2022 in the nomination “World Peace”. The award was founded by Wprost, the one of the most influential and oldest publications in Poland.

On November 9, 2022, Olena Zelenska was included in the ELLE 100 Women.

On December 6, 2022, the First Lady of Ukraine Olena Zelenska received the Hillary Rodham Clinton Awards, presented annually by the Georgetown Institute for Women, Peace and Security for exceptional leadership in recognizing the exceptional leadership in promoting women’s rights and creating a more peaceful and secure world for all.

She was honored as one of the BBC 100 Women in December 2022.

See also
 Olena Zelenska Foundation

Notes

References

External links

 First Lady of Ukraine Official website
 Social media: , 
 
 

1978 births
Living people
20th-century Ukrainian women writers
21st-century Ukrainian women writers
Eastern Orthodox Christians from Ukraine
Ecofeminists
Family of Volodymyr Zelenskyy
First Ladies of Ukraine
Kryvyi Rih National University alumni
Mass media people from Kryvyi Rih
People from Kryvyi Rih
Ukrainian environmentalists
Ukrainian feminists
Ukrainian screenwriters
Women screenwriters
BBC 100 Women